An archway is the passage ("way") under an arch.

Archway may also refer to:

United Kingdom

Archway, London, an area of London, United Kingdom
Archway tube station, London Underground station
Archway Road, a major road in London
Archway Tower
Archway School, a secondary school in Stroud, Gloucestershire, United Kingdom
Thames Archway Company, a former company formed to build a tunnel under the River Thames

United States

Archway Cookies, an American cookie manufacturer
Great Platte River Road Archway Monument, a monument in Nebraska, United States
Archway Academy, a private high school in Houston, Texas, United States
The Archway, a newspaper at Bryant University, Smithfield, Rhode Island, United States

Other uses

Archway (solitaire)
Operation Archway, a military operation in the Second World War

See also
Arch (disambiguation)
Arches (disambiguation)